Sinden is a surname. Notable people with the surname include:

Bradly Sinden (born 1998), British taekwondo athlete
Donald Sinden (1923–2014) English stage, television and film actor
Harry Sinden (born 1932) former Boston Bruins NHL coach and general manager
Jeremy Sinden (1950–1996) English actor, son of Donald
Marc Sinden (born 1954) English film director, actor and theatre producer, son of Donald
Topsy Sinden (1878–1950) English dancer, actress and singer